The Delaware Volunteer Firemen's Association is an organization established to assist the volunteer fire companies of the state of Delaware.

History 

The Delaware Volunteer Fireman's Association can be traced to a meeting in January 1921. Several firemen from throughout the state of Delaware met in Milford to establish a state fireman's association. The Carlisle Fire Company of Milford was authorized to begin the process to form the association. Notices were to be sent to all volunteer fire companies throughout the state, asking them to send two delegates to a meeting at Milford on February 24, 1921, although some newer companies were left out, such as the newly formed Ellendale Vol. Fire Company, the next company south of Milford, which had been formed in April 1920.

The state of Delaware releases an audit each year on the costs and savings of the volunteer fire departments in the state. For the fiscal year ending June 30, 2012 it was estimated that the volunteer fire departments in the state saved the taxpayers more than $289,000,000.

  
The first resolution was adopted at the first meeting:

"Resolved, that we, the delegates of the Volunteer Fire Companies in the State of Delaware, in convention assembled in order to form a more perfect organization, establish harmony, insure prosperity and success, obtain and compile statistics concerning the practical working of various apparatus, cultivate fraternal fellowship among the companies and promote the best interest of the Volunteer Firemen of Delaware, do hereby form an organization to be known as the Delaware State Volunteer Firemen's Association."

With the delegates from the nine companies present, the officers were elected and a set of by-laws was adopted.

The first regular convention was held on July 1, 1921, at the Laurel Fire Department, with thirteen companies being represented. The association has continued to hold conventions regularly each year with the exception of 1942–1944, when gatherings were restricted by World War II to executive meetings. Today, all 60 volunteer fire companies in the state are members of the Delaware Volunteer Firemen's Association. The Wilmington Fire Department, Delaware's only paid municipal fire department, is an associate member.

On January 20, 2009, the Delaware Volunteer Firemen's Association marched in the inauguration parade for President Barack Obama as a guest of Vice-President Joseph Biden of Delaware who is an honorary member and President Emeritus of the D.V.F.A. Five members from all 60 departments were invited to march in the parade, led by the marching band of the Citizen's Hose Company of Smyrna.

Presidents 

The president of the Delaware Volunteer Firemen's Association is elected to a 1-year term, beginning in September at a presentation at the annual conference. The presidency is on a rotating basis between Delaware's three counties, Sussex, Kent, and New Castle, with the representatives from the other two counties being the first and second vice-president based on when they will become president in the rotation. There was no president in 1942 and 1943 due to World War 2.

Fireman of the Year Award

References 

Firefighters associations in the United States
Firefighting in the United States
Organizations established in 1921
1921 establishments in Delaware